This is a list of songs that reached number one on the Billboard magazine Streaming Songs chart in 2021.

Chart history

See also 

 2021 in American music
 List of Billboard Hot 100 number ones of 2021

References 

United States Streaming Songs
Streaming 2021